is a Japanese actress and voice actress from Mitaka, Tokyo. She is in the two-person group "Whoops!!" with Maaya Sakamoto.

Career
Higuchi made her debut in 1996, before she had finished high school, in Mizuiro Jidai, voicing the character of Takako Takahata. On February 5, 1997 she released an album Believe under the EMI label.

In 1998, Higuchi provided the voice of Princess Mimori in the series Kero Kero Chime, a story about Aoi, a schoolboy who is cursed by a wizard and told that if he wants to remove the curse he must find Mimori (the main female character in the 30-episode series). In 1999, she provided the voice of tomboy Shiho Nagaoka in the series To Heart. Higuchi also received her first film credit, voicing the main character of Marco in the film Marco: 3000 Leagues in Search of Mother.

In the summer of 2004, Higuchi released the albums Favorite Shoes, the Azumanga Daioh Character CD Series 4: Tomo Takino and Azumanga Daiō Kyarakutā Shīdī Shirīzu 4: Takino Tomo which after its release on July 24, 2004 ranked 80th in Oricon singles charts. On March 25, 2005, she released The Best of Rival Players XXIV Yohei Tanaka & Kohei Tanaka, which ranked 75th in the Oricon singles charts.

She voiced the character of Yūko Atoda in the 2005 series Ah My Buddha, playing another tomboy. She reprised voicing this character in the 2006 sequel, Amaenaideyo!! Katsu!!. Later in 2005, Higuchi voiced the character of Hibiki Watanuki in the TV Tokyo series Pani Poni Dash!, a parody which frequently references Japanese and American popular culture.

Filmography

Anime television

Mizuiro Jidai (1996), Takako Takahata
Kero Kero Chime (1997), Mimori
Beast Wars II: Super Life-Form Transformers (1998), Artemis
To Heart (1999), Shiho Nagaoka
Medabots (1999), Rintaro
Transformers: Car Robots (2000), Ai-chan, Junko
Comic Party (2001), Shiho
Offside (2001), Nagisa Ito
The Prince of Tennis (2001), Youhei Tanaka
Azumanga Daioh (2002), Tomo Takino

Whistle! (2002), Tsubasa Shiina
Yu-Gi-Oh! Duel Monsters (2003), Kris
To Heart: Remember My Memories (2004), Shiho Nagaoka
Yu-Gi-Oh! Duel Monster GX (2004), Kohara
Meine Liebe (2004), Erika
Glass Mask (2005), Miki Tanuma (eps.41, 43)
Ah My Buddha (2005), Yuko Atoda
Pani Poni Dash! (2005), Hibiki Watanuki
Eyeshield 21 (2005–2008), Juri Sawai
Amaenaideyo!! Katsu!! (2006), Yuko Atoda
Gin'yuu Mokushiroku Meine Liebe ~Wieder~ (2006), Erika
Princess Princess (2006), Sayaka
Yu-Gi-Oh! 5D's (2008), Angela

Sources:

OVA
 Hunter × Hunter: Greed Island (2003), Biscuit Krueger

Sources:

Film
 Marco: 3000 Leagues in Search of Mother (1999), Marco
 Azumanga Daioh: The Very Short Movie (2001), Tomo Takino

Sources:

Video games
Super Robot Wars Alpha 3 (2005), Fei Yen the Knight
Phoenix Wright: Ace Attorney − Spirit of Justice (2016), Minuki Naruhodo

Discography

"Dennou Senki Virtual On 'CyberNet Rhapsody'" (1996) a Virtual On drama CD, acting and singing as Fei-Yen Kn.
"Believe" (February 5, 1997, EMI Music Japan)
 (June 21, 2004)
 (July 24, 2004, Lantis), image song single of the eponymous character ranked 80th in Oricon singles charts.
"The Best of Rival Players XXIV Yohei Tanaka & Kohei Tanaka" (March 24, 2005), ranked 75th in Oricon singles charts.

With Maaya Sakamoto as "Whoops!!" :
"Love Love Phantasy" (January 20, 1999) 
"ジーニー" (June 17, 1999) 
P (July 16, 1999) 
P' (March 10, 2006)

References

External links
  
  
 

1981 births
Living people
Japanese musical theatre actresses
Japanese video game actresses
Japanese voice actresses
People from Mitaka, Tokyo
Voice actresses from Tokyo Metropolis
20th-century Japanese actresses
21st-century Japanese actresses